The 2005 Motor City Bowl, part of the 2005–06 NCAA football bowl games season, occurred on December 27, 2005 at Ford Field in Detroit, Michigan.  The Memphis Tigers beat the Akron Zips 38–31.

This game is most noteworthy for being the first FBS bowl game the University of Akron Zips football team has played in, and for being the final college game for All-American and All-Pro running back DeAngelo Williams. Williams was named the Game MVP.

References

External links
 ESPN game recap

Motor City Bowl
Little Caesars Pizza Bowl
Akron Zips football bowl games
Memphis Tigers football bowl games
December 2005 sports events in the United States
2005 in sports in Michigan
2005 in Detroit